Team Hrinkow Advarics Cycleang is an Austrian UCI Continental team founded in 2015. It participates in UCI Continental Circuits races.

Team roster

Major wins
2015
Stage 7 Rás Tailteann, Andreas Müller
 Overall Tour of Szeklerland, Clemens Fankhauser
Stage 2, Clemens Fankhauser
2017
 Overall Tour of Szeklerland, Patrick Bosman
Stage 1, Christian Mager
Stage 2, Patrick Bosman
2019
 Overall Tour of Szeklerland, Jonas Rapp
Stage 2, Dominik Hrinkow
2021
 Overall Giro della Regione Friuli Venezia Giulia, Jonas Rapp
Stage 2, Jonas Rapp

References

External links

UCI Continental Teams (Europe)
Cycling teams based in Austria
Cycling teams established in 2015
2015 establishments in Austria